The New Jersey General Assembly is the lower house of the New Jersey Legislature.  The following is the roster and leadership positions for the 2004-2006 term.  The term began on January 12, 2004 and ended on January 10, 2006.

This assembly was preceded by the 2002-2004 assembly and was followed by the 2006-2008 assembly.

Leadership
Speaker: Albio Sires (District 33)

Majority Leader: Joseph J. Roberts (District 5)

Speaker Pro Tempore: Donald Kofi Tucker (District 28)

Majority Conference Leader: Loretta Weinberg (District 37)

Deputy Speaker Pro Tempore: Jerry Green (District 22)

Deputy Speakers: Herb Conaway (District 7), Nellie Pou (District 35), Joan M. Quigley (District 32), Alfred E. Steele (District 35), John S. Wisniewski (District 19)

Deputy Majority Leader: Neil M. Cohen (District 20)

Assistant Majority Leaders: John J. Burzichelli (District 3); Nilsa Cruz-Perez (District 5); 
Joseph Cryan (District 20); Linda R. Greenstein (District 14)

Parliamentarian: Wilfredo Caraballo (District 29)

Deputy Majority Conference Leader: William D. Payne (District 29)

Majority Whip: Peter J. Barnes (District 18)

Assistant Majority Whips: John F. McKeon (District 27); Robert J. Smith II (District 4)

Minority Leader: Alex DeCroce (District 26)

Minority Conference Leader: Guy R. Gregg (District 24)

Minority Whip: Francis J. Blee (District 2)

Deputy Minority Leaders: Kevin J. O'Toole (District 40); Steve Corodemus (District 11)

Assistant Minority Leaders: Christopher Bateman (District 16); Samuel D. Thompson (District 13); David W. Wolfe (District 10)

Assistant Minority Whips: Francis L. Bodine (District 8); Sean T. Kean (District 11); Alison Littell McHose (District 24)

Policy Chair: Steve Corodemus (District 11)

Parliamentarian: Michael Patrick Carroll (District 25)

Assistant Parliamentarian: Bill Baroni (District 14)

Members of the New Jersey General Assembly (by District)
District 1: John C. Gibson (R, Vineland) and Jeff Van Drew (D, Ocean City)
District 2: Francis J. Blee (R, Absecon) and Kirk W. Conover (R, Absecon)
District 3: John J. Burzichelli (D, Thorofare) and Douglas H. Fisher (D, Thorofare)
District 4: David R. Mayer (D, Blackwood) and Robert J. Smith II (D, Turnersville)
District 5: Nilsa Cruz-Perez (D, Camden) and Joseph J. Roberts (D, Brooklawn)
District 6: Louis Greenwald (D, Voorhees) and Mary Previte (D, Haddonfield)
District 7: Herb Conaway (D, Delran) and Jack Conners (D, Delran)
District 8: Francis L. Bodine (R, Mount Laurel) and Larry Chatzidakis (R, Mount Laurel)
District 9: Christopher J. Connors (R, Forked River) and Brian E. Rumpf (R, Forked River)
District 10: James W. Holzapfel (R, Brick) and David W. Wolfe (R, Brick)
District 11: Steve Corodemus (R, Atlantic Highlands) and Sean T. Kean (R, Wall Township)
District 12: Robert Lewis Morgan (D, Red Bank) and Michael J. Panter (D, Red Bank)
District 13: Joseph Azzolina (R, Middletown) and Samuel D. Thompson (R, Matawan)
District 14: Bill Baroni (R, Hamilton) and Linda R. Greenstein (R, Monroe)
District 15: Reed Gusciora (D, Trenton) and Bonnie Watson Coleman (D, Trenton)
District 16: Christopher Bateman (R, Somerville) and Peter J. Biondi (R, Somerville)
District 17: Upendra J. Chivukula (D, Somerset) and Joseph V. Egan (D, New Brunswick)
District 18: Peter J. Barnes (D, Edison) and Patrick J. Diegnan (D, South Plainfield)
District 19: Joseph Vas (D, Perth Amboy) and John S. Wisniewski (D, Parlin)
District 20: Neil M. Cohen (D, Union) and Joseph Cryan (D, Union)
District 21: Jon Bramnick (R, Westfield) and Eric Munoz (R, Summit)
District 22: Jerry Green (D, Plainfield) and Linda Stender (D, Scotch Plains)
District 23: Michael J. Doherty (R, Washington) and Connie Myers (R, Milford)
District 24: Guy R. Gregg (R, Flanders) and Alison Littell McHose (R, Sparta)
District 25: Michael Patrick Carroll (R, Morristown) and Richard A. Merkt (R, Randolph)
District 26: Alex DeCroce (R, Morris Plains) and Joseph Pennacchio (R, Morris Plains)
District 27: Mims Hackett (D, South Orange) and John F. McKeon (D, South Orange)
District 28: Craig A. Stanley (D, Irvington) and Donald Kofi Tucker (D, Newark). Tucker died on October 17, 2005 and his seat was not filled until the November 2006 election.
District 29: Wilfredo Caraballo (D, Newark) and William D. Payne (D, Newark)
District 30: Ronald S. Dancer (R, Jackson Township) and Joseph R. Malone (R, Bordentown)
District 31: Anthony Chiappone (D, Bayonne) and Louis Manzo (D, Jersey City)
District 32: Vincent Prieto (D, Jersey City) and Joan M. Quigley (D, Secaucus)
District 33: Albio Sires (D, West New York) and Brian P. Stack (D, Union City)
District 34: Peter C. Eagler (D, Clifton) and Sheila Y. Oliver (D, East Orange)
District 35: Nellie Pou (D, Paterson) and Alfred E. Steele (D, Paterson)
District 36: Paul DiGaetano (R, Rutherford) and Frederick Scalera (D, Nutley)
District 37: Gordon M. Johnson (D, Englewood) and Loretta Weinberg (D, Teaneck).
District 38: Robert M. Gordon (D, Fair Lawn) and Joan Voss (D, Fort Lee)
District 39: John E. Rooney (R, Emerson) and Charlotte Vandervalk (R, Westwood)
District 40: Kevin J. O'Toole (R, Wayne) and David C. Russo (R, Midland Park)

See also
 List of New Jersey state legislatures

2004-2006
2000s in New Jersey